Ulf Thomas Hedengran (born February 11, 1965) is a Swedish actor. He is often cast in grisly thrillers and horror films.

Biography
Hedengran has become a well-known actor in many Swedish television series and films. He has also worked as a stage actor in Lorden från gränden and Intiman.

He participated in the musical Lorden från gränden and Intiman. He also played 265 performances of the revue Alla ska bada as a member of the theatre group  Galenskaparna och After Shave. Another member of the group, Peter Rangmar, unexpectedly died just before the premiere.

He has also appeared in minor roles in a couple of others of the group's film and TV productions such as Ake from Åstol and the citizen. He also played farce Stolen love at Liseberg Theatre in Gothenburg, and later at Intiman in Stockholm and finally on tour in southern Sweden. In 2006 he played a doctor in the horror comedy Frostbite. More recently, he appears in the starring role of Krister in Marianne and is set to play a vengeful pagan father in the upcoming viking film Inferior.

Filmography
2018 - Draug
2016 - Inferior
2014 - Faust 2.0
2014 - The Thieves' Christmas: The Wizard's Daughter
2011 - The Thieves' Christmas
2011 – Marianne
2008 - Oskyldigt dömd
2008 - Dead on Arrival
2006 - Frostbite
2006 - Sökarna: Återkomsten
2004 - The Commission
2002 - The Invisible
1999 - En liten julsaga
1998 - Hamilton
1996 - The Disappearance of Finbar
1996 - The Hunters

References

External links 
 
 

1965 births
Living people
Swedish male television actors
Swedish male film actors
Swedish male stage actors
20th-century Swedish male actors
21st-century Swedish male actors
Male actors from Stockholm